Hoddøya is an island in the municipality of Namsos in Trøndelag county, Norway. The island is located between the island of Otterøya (to the north and east) and the mainland of Namdalseid municipality (to the south and west).

See also
List of islands of Norway

References

Islands of Trøndelag
Namsos